is a Japanese former figure skater. He is the 1977 and 1979-1981 Japanese national champion. His highest placement at the World Championships was fourth, in 1981. He placed ninth at the 1980 Winter Olympics. He was coached by Frank Carroll.

After retirement from competitive skating, he was employed by Dentsu, an advertising agency. In addition, he worked as a skating consultant for NHK until 2006.

Results

References

 Skatabase: 1980 Winter Olympics - Men  
 Skatabase: 1970s Worlds - Men  
 Skatabase: 1980s Worlds - Men  
 Japanese Nationals - Men's Singles Results  

Japanese male single skaters
Figure skaters at the 1980 Winter Olympics
Olympic figure skaters of Japan
Living people
1958 births